Maesobotrya barteri var. sparsiflora is a variety of flowering plant belonging to the family Phyllanthaceae, or by some  authors classified in Euphorbiaceae sensu lato, native to Côte d'Ivoire. Its fruits are edible and known as "apotrewa".

References

Phyllanthaceae
Flora of Ivory Coast
Taxa named by Ronald William John Keay
Tropical fruit
Fruits originating in Africa